Early Grove is an unincorporated community located in Marshall County, Mississippi, United States, near the Mississippi/Tennessee border.

References

Unincorporated communities in Mississippi
Unincorporated communities in Marshall County, Mississippi
Memphis metropolitan area